The 1983 Swedish motorcycle Grand Prix was the eleventh round of the 1983 Grand Prix motorcycle racing season. It took place on the weekend of 4–6 August at the Scandinavian Raceway in Anderstorp, Sweden.

Race summary
One of the most dramatic races in one of the most dramatic Grand Prix seasons ended in controversy as the championship's two main combatants collided on the last lap while battling for the lead.

Coming into the Swedish Grand Prix, Honda's Freddie Spencer led Yamaha's Kenny Roberts 117 to 115 with each man having won five of the season's ten previous races. Roberts had the momentum, having won four of the previous five rounds.

Roberts led Spencer going into the last lap of the race. Heading down the back straight, Spencer placed his Honda right behind Roberts' Yamaha as they reached the second to the last corner, a ninety degree right-hander. As both riders applied their brakes, Spencer came out of Roberts' slipstream and managed to get inside of the Yamaha. As they exited the corner, both riders ran wide off the track and into the dirt. Spencer was able to get back on the track and back on the power first, crossing the finish line just ahead of Roberts for a crucial victory. Roberts considered Spencer's pass to be foolish and dangerous and, exchanged angry words with him on the podium.

It was a controversial pass by the young Honda rider and one that the two participants still dispute to this day. Roberts contends that it was a dangerous move while Spencer maintains it was a calculated risk he had to take to secure the championship.

Classification

500 cc

1983 250cc Swedish Grand Prix final standings

1983 125cc Swedish Grand Prix final standings

Sidecar Classification

References

Swedish motorcycle Grand Prix
Swedish
Motorcycle Grand Prix